In plasma physics, the Lundquist number (denoted by ) is a dimensionless ratio which compares the timescale of an Alfvén wave crossing to the timescale of resistive diffusion. It is a special case of the magnetic Reynolds number when the Alfvén velocity is the typical velocity scale of the system, and is given by

High Lundquist numbers indicate highly conducting plasmas, while low Lundquist numbers indicate more resistive plasmas. Considerations of Lundquist number are especially important in magnetic reconnection.

See also
 Magnetic Prandtl number
 Péclet number
 Stuart number

References

Plasma physics